CNW stands for the Chicago and North Western Transportation Company, a U.S. railroad that existed from 1859 to 1995.

CNW may also refer to:
 China Northwest Airlines
 CNW Group, also Canada NewsWire, a Canadian commercial news release service
 CNW Marketing Research
 Con-way, a freight transportation and logistics company
 Conwy railway station, train request stop in Wales, UK
 Córdoba North Western Railway
 TSTC Waco Airport, in Texas, United States (IATA code)